Rui Pedro Rebelo Bragança (born 26 December 1991) is a Portuguese taekwondo practitioner who competes in the men's 58 kg (flyweight) category.

Career 
Born in Guimarães, Bragança started practising taekwondo with 13 years old when he joined a class at Vitória de Guimarães gym. Two years later, he won the Portuguese National Junior Championships which led to a spot at the European Junior Championships in Baku, where he won the bronze medal.

In 2014, Bragança led the world ranking in his weight category.

He graduated in Medicine at University of Minho.

In 2016 he signed with Benfica, along with his coach Hugo Serrão and his training partner Nuno Costa, all coming from Vitória de Guimarães. In 2019 he extended his contract for two more years with the main focus on the 2020 Summer Olympics.

He has qualified to the 2020 Summer Olympics through the 2021 European Taekwondo Olympic Qualification Tournament.

References

External links
 

1991 births
Living people
Sportspeople from Guimarães
Portuguese male taekwondo practitioners
European Games gold medalists for Portugal
European Games medalists in taekwondo
Taekwondo practitioners at the 2015 European Games
Taekwondo practitioners at the 2016 Summer Olympics
Olympic taekwondo practitioners of Portugal
Universiade medalists in taekwondo
S.L. Benfica (martial arts)
Mediterranean Games silver medalists for Portugal
Mediterranean Games medalists in taekwondo
Competitors at the 2018 Mediterranean Games
Universiade silver medalists for Portugal
European Taekwondo Championships medalists
World Taekwondo Championships medalists
Medalists at the 2017 Summer Universiade
Medalists at the 2015 Summer Universiade
Taekwondo practitioners at the 2020 Summer Olympics
21st-century Portuguese people